Omar Al-Rashedi (Arabic:عمر الراشدي) (born 24 April 1994) is an Emirati footballer who plays as a winger, most recently for Baniyas.

External links

References

Emirati footballers
1994 births
Living people
Al Wahda FC players
Baniyas Club players
UAE First Division League players
UAE Pro League players
Association football forwards